Shioda Dam is a rockfill dam located in Tochigi prefecture in Japan. The dam is used for irrigation. The catchment area of the dam is 2.6 km2. The dam impounds about 6  ha of land when full and can store 460 thousand cubic meters of water. The construction of the dam was started on 1977 and completed in 2000.

References

Dams in Tochigi Prefecture
2000 establishments in Japan